Around the World with Dot, (also known as Dot and Santa Claus) is a 1981 Australian animated film directed by Yoram Gross and starring Drew Forsythe and Ron Haddrick. It is a sequel to Dot and the Kangaroo.

Premise
Dot joins Santa Claus on a tour of the world to see everyone celebrate Christmas in their own different ways. They search for a long lost beloved joey.

Cast

Live action
 Drew Forsythe - Danny the Swagman
 Ashley Ayre - Dot (live-action segments)
 Ben Alcott - Ben (live-action segments)
 Frank Gott (live-acton segments)
 Marli Mason (live-action segments)

Animated
 Drew Forsythe - Santa Claus
 Barbara Frawley - Dot, Zebra, French Swallow
 Ron Haddrick - Grumblebones, Frog, Circus Elephant, Tiger, British Lion
 Anne Haddy - Dozeyface, Angry Mom, Natasha
 Ross Higgins - Reindeer, Mr. Nagamora, Kite Judge, Ringmaster

References

External links
Around the World with Dot at IMDb
Around the World with Dot at Oz Movies

1981 films
1980s Australian animated films
1980s children's adventure films
1980s children's animated films
1980s musical films
Animated adventure films
Animated films about bears
Animated films about wombats
Australian children's animated films
Australian children's adventure films
Australian children's musical films
Australian Christmas films
Films directed by Yoram Gross
Films with live action and animation
1980s English-language films
Australian animated feature films
1980s Australian films
Flying Bark Productions films
Santa Claus in film